Kajo Baldisimo is a Filipino comic book artist best known for illustrating the horror/crime komiks series Trese, co-creating it with writer Budjette Tan. He is also the penciller of the forty-first issue of the Star Wars: Legacy comic series, Legacy 41: Rogue's End. His work Trese has won the Philippine National Book Award for Best Graphic Literature of the Year in 2009, 2011, 2012. It has been adapted into an animated series by Netflix.

References

External links
 

Living people
Filipino comics artists
Filipino speculative fiction writers
Year of birth missing (living people)
Place of birth missing (living people)